The Rail Heritage Trust of New Zealand is a charitable trust established in October 1991. At the time the New Zealand Railways Corporation was being split into New Zealand Rail Limited, which would own all the rail, ferry and network operations of the corporation (and was eventually privatised in 1993) and the Corporation, which was to dispose of the remaining assets and hold onto the land beneath the railway network.

Former New Zealand Railways Corporation executive, Euan McQueen, helped form the trust, and was chair from 1991 to 2012. McQueen, who had retired from NZR in 1988, had become concerned that with privatisation, historic assets would be lost. As Tranz Rail disposed of historic assets during the 1990s and early 2000s, the Trust picked up a lot of work preserving various stations, rolling stock and other equipment. The Rail Heritage trust pioneered the concept of "heritage rolling stock" which was leased to various preservation groups around New Zealand by Tranz Rail. Over 200 such items of rolling stock are now leased.

See also 
 Railway preservation in New Zealand

References

External links 

Heritage railways in New Zealand